Ken and Neal Skupski were the defending champions but chose not to defend their title.

Marin and Tomislav Draganja won the title after defeating Romain Arneodo and Danilo Petrović 6–4, 6–7(2–7), [10–2] in the final.

Seeds

Draw

References
 Main Draw

Venice Challenge Save Cup - Doubles
2018 Doubles